Coluber karelini (spotted desert racer) is a species of snake found in West Asia and Central Asia.

Distribution
Its distribution includes Pakistan, Iran (Kavir Desert), Afghanistan, southern Kazakhstan, Turkmenistan, Uzbekistan, Tajikistan, Kyrgyzstan, and Kashmir. The type locality is in western Turkmenistan.

References
 Boulenger, George A. 1890 The Fauna of British India, Including Ceylon and Burma. Reptilia and Batrachia. Taylor & Francis, London, xviii, 541 pp.
 Brandt 1838 Bull. Acad. St. Petersb. iii: 243
 Schätti B; Wilson L D 1986 Coluber Linnaeus. Holarctic racers. Catalogue of American Amphibians and Reptiles No. 399 1986: 1-4

External links
 

Colubrids
Reptiles of Pakistan
Reptiles described in 1838